Aldergrove is a community in the Township of Langley within British Columbia, Canada, approximately  east of Vancouver. The community is urban in nature and, although not incorporated as a town, is often referred to as one. Aldergrove is located at the southeastern edge of both the Township of Langley and the Greater Vancouver metropolitan area, near the western edge of the Abbotsford metropolitan area. It is home to the Lynden–Aldergrove Border Crossing, one of the Lower Mainland's five land border crossings, connecting it with Lynden, Washington.

This is a predominantly agricultural area, with crops including medical cannabis, grown by Canopy Growth Corporation, in the Agricultural Land Reserve (British Columbia) area. This grow operation is the largest federally licensed cannabis facility in the world, with 400,000 sq. ft. (3.7 ha) of growing space and may eventually reach 1.3 million sq. ft. (12 ha).

Demographics 
Aldergrove was split up into two population centres in the Canada 2016 Census, the main part in the Township of Langley and the other part in the City of Abbotsford as "Aldergrove East." Aldergrove had a population of 15,498 living in 5,280 of its 5,557 total private dwellings, a 7.1% change from its 2011 population of 14,466. This population was divided into 12,007 residents of Aldergrove proper, in Langley; and 3,491 residents of Aldergrove East, in Abbotsford.

Arts and culture 
The A&E television series Bates Motel is filmed in Aldergrove, though it is set in the fictional town of White Pine Bay, Oregon. The series stars Freddie Highmore and Vera Farmiga and is a prequel to the famous 1960 Alfred Hitchcock horror film Psycho, which is based on the novel of the same name. The series is set in modern times and the first season was filmed in the fall of 2012. The set for the original home is located in Universal Studios Hollywood in Los Angeles, however a replica has been built in Aldergrove, where the series is filmed. Filming for the second season commenced in August 2013. The set is located on 272nd Street. Principal photography for the third season began on October 20, 2014 and was completed on March 1, 2015. The Kent farm from the TV series Smallville is a working farm in Aldergrove. Owned by the Anderlinis, their home was painted yellow for the show.

The fourth season of the Canadian television series, The Amazing Race Canada, starred two women from Aldergrove, Frankie Gassler and Amy Gassler. They ended up placing 4th in this race around the world.

In 2017, location filming for the Hallmark Channel original movie Coming Home for Christmas starring Danica Mckellar took place at a large mansion in Aldergrove.

Attractions 
The Greater Vancouver Zoo and the Twilight Drive-in Theatre are located in Aldergrove.

The Aldergrove Credit Union Community Centre opened in 2018, with an accompanying Otter Co-op Outdoor Experience water park, featuring water slides, a wave pool, lazy river and an aquaplay structure.

Sports

Government

Military 
The Royal Canadian Navy's primary communication station for the Pacific fleet is located at Naval Radio Site Aldergrove.

The Canadian military owns over one thousand acres of land just outside the main Aldergrove population area.

Politics 
Langley—Aldergrove in the House of Commons of Canada.

Infrastructure

Transportation 
Aldergrove is served by the #503 Aldergrove/Surrey Central Station bus route. The No. 503 operates trips every half-hour between Langley Centre and Fraser Hwy and 272nd Street. It is also served by the No. 21 Central Fraser Valley Transit System bus service that connects Aldergrove to Abbotsford.

An independently run trolley service briefly serviced Aldergrove before ceasing operations.

Aldergrove is located at the junction of Highway 13 and the Fraser Highway.

Education 
As part of School District 35 Langley, Aldergrove has one high school, Aldergrove Community Secondary School, four elementary schools, and a middle school:

Betty Gilbert Middle School
Coghlan Elementary School
North Otter Elementary School
Parkside Centennial Elementary School
Shortreed Elementary School

Aldergrove Elementary School had been an active school until 2007, when protests since 2005 failed to prevent closure due to running under capacity with 189 pupils in 2006. The school has since been torn down, with a new community centre being built in its place.

Aldergrove also has four private schools: Khalsa School Fraser valley (26345 62),  Aldergrove Christian Academy and Fraser Valley Adventist Academy, both of which are K-12 schools; and Combined Christian School.

See also 
Otter Co-op
Aldergrove Credit Union
Grande West Transportation Group
Canopy Growth Corporation

References

External links 

Neighbourhoods in Langley, British Columbia
Langley, British Columbia (district municipality)